The Lambda Literary Award for Anthology is an annual literary award, presented by the Lambda Literary Foundation, that awards "[c]ollections of fiction, nonfiction, and poetry" with LGBT content. The award has been included since the first Lambda Literary Award ceremony but has included different iterations (i.e., Anthology, Gay Anthology, Lesbian Anthology, LGBT Anthology, LGBT Anthology Fiction and Nonfiction, and LGBTQ Anthology, and LGBTQ Anthology Fiction and Nonfiction).

Recipients

References 

Anthology
Awards established in 1990
English-language literary awards
Lists of LGBT-related award winners and nominees